Dmitry Borisovich Fuchs (Дмитрий Борисович Фукс, born 30 September 1939, Kazan, Tatar Autonomous Soviet Socialist Republic) is a Russian-American mathematician, specializing in the representation theory of infinite-dimensional Lie groups and in topology.

Education and career
Fuchs received in 1964 his Russian candidate degree (Ph.D.) under Albert S. Schwarz at Moscow State University, where he taught thereafter. Schwarz conducted a seminar on algebraic topology with Mikhail Postnikov and Vladimir Boltyanski. Fuchs participated in the seminar and, as a student, published papers with  Schwarz, as did Askold Ivanovich Vinogradov a few years earlier. Fuchs received his Russian doctorate (higher doctoral degree) in 1987 at Tbilisi State University. Since 1991 he has been a professor at the University of California, Davis.

With Israel Gelfand he introduced in 1970 the Gelfand-Fuchs cohomology of Lie algebras. Gelfand-Fuchs cohomology has applications in the proof of the Macdonald identities in combinatorics and in the calculation of characteristic classes of foliations. With Boris Feigin he determined the structure of Verma modules in the Virasoro algebra representation theory, which has applications in string theory and conformal field theory.

His students include Boris Feigin (with whom he has collaborated extensively), Fedor Malikov, Sergei Tabachnikov, and Vladimir Rokhlin, as well as Edward Frenkel for whom Fuchs was a second advisor.

In 1978 he was an Invited Speaker with talk New results on the characteristic classes of foliations at the International Congress of Mathematicians in Helsinki.

Selected publications
 with Anatoli T. Fomenko, Viktor L. Gutenmacher: Homotopic topology. Akadémiai Kiadó, Budapest 1986, . 
 Cohomology of infinite-dimensional Lie algebras. Consultants Bureau, New York NY 1986, .
 Singular vectors over the Virasoro Algebra and extended Verma Modules. In: Dmitry Fuchs (ed.): Unconventional Lie Algebras (= Advances in Soviet Mathematics. vol. 17). American Mathematical Society, Providence RI 1993, pp. 65–74.
 with Serge Tabachnikov: Mathematical omnibus. Thirty lectures on classic mathematics. American Mathematical Society, Providence RI 2007,

Sources
 Alexander Astashkevich, Serge Tabachnikov (eds.): Differential topology, infinite-dimensional lie algebras, and applications. D. B. Fuchs' 60th Anniversary Collection (= American Mathematical Society. Translations. Series 2, 194). American Mathematical Society, Providence RI 1999, .

References

External links
 a tribute to Boris Feigin on his 50th birthday 

1939 births
Living people
20th-century Russian mathematicians
20th-century American mathematicians
21st-century American mathematicians
Moscow State University alumni
Academic staff of Moscow State University
Academic staff of Tbilisi State University
University of California, Davis faculty
Mathematicians from Kazan